Peter Hall may refer to:

Entertainment
 Peter Adolf Hall (1739–1793), Swedish-French artist
 Peter J. Hall (1926–2010), American costume designer
 Peter Hall (director) (1930–2017), English theatre director

Religion
 Peter Hall (bishop) (1930–2013), Bishop of Woolwich, 1984–1996
 Peter Hall (priest) (1803–1849), English cleric and topographer
 Peter Hall (minister) (1851–1937), Jamaican

Sports
 Peter Hall (cricketer) (1927–2014), New Zealand cricketer
 Peter Hall (footballer, born 1939), English 
 Peter Hall (Australian footballer) (born 1957), for South Melbourne
 Peter Hall (New Zealand footballer)
 Peter Hall (sailor) (born 1949), in yacht races

Other
 Peter Hall (RNZAF officer) (1922–2010), New Zealand WWII pilot
 Peter Hall (urbanist) (1932–2014), English professor of urban planning
 Peter Hall (diplomat) (born 1938), British Ambassador to Argentina and Serbia
 Peter Dobkin Hall (1946–2015), American professor of history
 Peter W. Hall (1948–2021), American federal judge
 Peter Gavin Hall (1951–2016), Australian professor of mathematics
 Peter Hall (politician) (born 1952), Australian National Party member
 Peter Hall (financier) (born 1960), Australian financier